The Ålvand Allied bomber crash refers to the shooting down of the Allied Avro Lancaster PB202 by a German night fighter over the small lake Ålvand, in the heathland east of Nørre Vorupør, Thy, Denmark, on the night of 29 August 1944. All of the seven crew were killed.

Background
On 29 August 1944, at 2110 English time (2210 Danish time), a total of 402 RAF planes, including the Lancaster in question, took off for a bombing raid towards Stettin and Königsberg. The planned route passed over northern Denmark, then continued over Sweden and Germany; it returned the same way. 23 of the aircraft were ultimately lost.

It was previously thought that the downed bomber was first hit on its return flight by anti-aircraft artillery at Lyngby Battery, located on the coast ~10km south of Vorupør, Thy. However, later investigation showed that the bomber was instead first hit on its outbound flight by shots fired from a radar-equipped German night fighter over Lodbjerg (slightly further south on the Danish west coast). The bomber was executing a course change from north east to east by south-east at the time, in order to proceed to the Kullen region of Scania. The night fighter was probably scrambled following the bomber being detected by several German radar installations in Denmark. A small Wassermann-S radar at Thyborøn (on the coast south of Ålvand) pinged the Lancaster on the night of the crash, as did an installation at Hjardemål (inland, to the north-east).

The bomber
The Lancaster was part of RAF No. 8 (Pathfinder Force) Group, No. 582 Squadron and was based at RAF Little Staughton. It was used as a Pathfinder aircraft, which were responsible for marking targets for other bombers using flares and incendiary weapons.

The crash
After being shot by the night fighter, the Lancaster banked. It likely passed over Lyngby Battery as it did so, taking further damage from the artillery there. In flames and rapidly losing height, it passed low over the farm Udemark by Førby Lake, 2km east of Nørre Vorupør. It glanced off a dune and struck the ground violently next to the small lake Ålvand; it is believed the crew were attempting to ditch into the lake. All of the crew were killed on impact.

At the crash site, five large holes created by the bomber's four engines and the fuselage itself remain today.

The German aircraft and crew
The German aircraft was a Junkers Ju 88 night fighter from Luftwaffe Nachtjagdgeschwader 3, Squadron 4, piloted by the fighter ace Unteroffizier (Corporal) Bruno Rupp. Two other crew members, by the names of Eckert and Biell, were also aboard. Rupp engaged the Lancaster from a height of 3600m, and it became his 11th shootdown of the war. In total, Rupp would later reach 16 confirmed shootdowns.

Bomber crew and burial

The killed airmen were initially buried in the heathland at the site of the crash by the German Wehrmacht. A white wooden cross was raised at the grave by German soldiers, with text (in German) reading "Hier ruhen 7 unbekannte anglo amerik. Flieger 29.8.1944" (English: "Here lie 7 unknown Anglo-Americans. Airmen, 29.8.1944").

On 3 February 1947, British authorities exhumed the bodies, placed them in coffins, and re-buried them at Vorupør Cemetery. The same plot also contains the remains of an unidentified British soldier, who was washed ashore on the beach near Nørre Vorupør in Autumn 1944. He was initially buried on the shore by the Wehrmacht and was then, following the German surrender, exhumed and moved to the churchyard by locals on 14 June 1945.

Descriptions by locals
It remains uncertain exactly which bombs were carried by the Lancaster, but it is clear that it released three bombs over the farm meadows at Koustrup Møllegaard, Sønderhå (approximately 10km south by south-east of Ålvand) prior to the crash. The bombs, which were probably photoflash bombs, caused damage to buildings in the area. Locals described an intense flash that temporarily turned night to day, followed by a loud bang and shaking. After the Lancaster was hit, the crew would have had good reason to eject any ordnance over a sparsely populated area, partly to prevent civilian casualties but also to minimise the chance of the crew being killed by explosions if the aircraft was to crash. The photoflashes left several craters at Koustrup Møllegaard; during subsequent summers, workers at the farm were tasked with filling in the holes when there was no other work to be carried out.

Agnes Møller (born 1909), who lived on the farm at the time, wrote of the bombs in her memoirs:

In Nørre Vorupør, locals reported an enormous ball of light so brilliant that "you could see a matchstick in the gravel".

References

Accidents and incidents involving Royal Air Force aircraft
Aviation accidents and incidents in Denmark
Aviation accidents and incidents in 1944